The 1951 Kentucky gubernatorial election was held on November 6, 1951. Incumbent Democrat Lawrence Wetherby defeated Republican nominee Eugene Siler with 54.60% of the vote.

Primary elections
Primary elections were held on August 4, 1951.

Democratic primary

Candidates
Lawrence Wetherby, incumbent Governor
Howell W. Vincent, attorney
Jesse N. R. Cecil

Results

Republican primary

Candidates
Eugene Siler, Judge of the Kentucky Court of Appeals
Wendell H. Meade, former U.S. Representative

Results

General election

Candidates
Lawrence Wetherby, Democratic
Eugene Siler, Republican

Results

References

1951
Kentucky
Gubernatorial
November 1951 events in the United States